Pechersk, also spelled Pechyorsk, is a rural locality (a selo) in Smolensky District of Smolensk Oblast, Russia, located  north of Smolensk. Population:   4,067 (1998 est.).

Etymology
The name "Pechersk" is derived from the Old Russian word "", meaning "cave".

History
In 1859, it had an Orthodox church and a population of nineteen (ten male and nine female), living in five homesteads. Administratively, it was a part of Smolensky Uyezd of Smolensk Governorate.

Until December 28, 2004, it had a status of a settlement.

On April 10, 2010, a Tupolev Tu-154M aircraft of the Polish 36th Special Aviation Regiment crashed near Smolensk-North air base near Pechersk, killing the President of Poland Lech Kaczyński and other Polish officials.

References

Rural localities in Smolensk Oblast